Vivana Singh is an Indian actress who had appeared in TV serials like Mahabharat, Police Factory, Ajeeb Daastaan Hai Ye, Kumkum Bhagya etc. She is known for her roles as Inspector Maya Mohan and Sarika Sachdev.

Early life
Singh was born in Moradabad, Uttar Pradesh and has her ancestral home in Amroha. She studied in a boarding school in Mussoorie.

Filmography

Television 
 Mahabharat as Goddess Ganga
 Kehta Hai Dil Jee Le Zara as Suparna Anvay Goel
 Ajeeb Daastaan Hai Ye as Sarika Sachdev / Madhura Kashyap
 Police Factory as Inspector Maya Mohan 
 Savdhaan India as Savita 
 C.I.D. as Cyber Inspector Ritu 
 Kumkum Bhagya as Simonika Dushyant Rana  
 Laal Ishq as Daanvi
 Apna Time Bhi Aayega as Rajeshwari Singh Rajawat (Rani Sa)
 Shubh Shagun as Bindiya

Web-series
 Faceless as Nisha Thakral positive role.
 Shrikant Bashir as Shalani Kaura the only female negative character in the series. Production (Banijay and Salman Khan)

References

External links 

Living people
Indian television actresses
People from Moradabad
People from Mussoorie
Year of birth missing (living people)